Hoarella is a genus of parasitic alveolates in the phylum Apicomplexa. This genus infects reptiles.

Only one species (Hoarella garnhami) in this genus is recognised.

Description

This genus was described in 1963 by Arcay de Peraza.

The meronts and gamonts are found within the intestinal wall.

The oocysts have 16 sporocysts each of which has 2 sporozoites.

The life cycle is currently not known.

Host range

This species is found in the rainbow whiptail lizard (Cnemidophorus lemniscatus).

References

Apicomplexa genera

id:Eucoccidiorida
it:Eucoccidiorida